Coleophora drymidis is a moth of the family Coleophoridae. It is found in Croatia and Greece.

The larvae feed on Drypis spinosa. They create a brown leaf case of 7–8 mm. The case is covered by dense wool and has a mouth angle of about 35°. Full-grown larvae can be found in June.

References

drymidis
Moths described in 1857
Moths of Europe